RTV Visoko or Televizija Visoko is a local Bosnian  public television channel based in Visoko municipality. Under this name, it was established in 1994 when local Radio Visoko started television broadcasting.

RTV Visoko broadcasts a variety of programs such as local news, local sports, mosaic and documentaries. Program is mainly produced in Bosnian language.

Radio Visoko is also part of public municipality services.

References

External links 
 Official website of RTV Visoko
 Communications Regulatory Agency of Bosnia and Herzegovina

Television channels and stations established in 1994
Television stations in Bosnia and Herzegovina